Events in the year 1925 in Egypt.

Sherif Ismail

Incumbents

 King: Fuad I of Egypt
 Prime minister: Ahmad Ziwar Pasha

Events
January 25: The tomb of Tutankhamun is reopened to allow Howard Carter to resume his archaeological investigation. Some artefacts are found to be damaged as a result of careless storage by the antiquities department.
March 23: 1925 Egyptian parliamentary election

Births
March 13: Samir Gharbo, Egyptian water polo player (died 2018)

Deaths

References

 
Years of the 20th century in Egypt
Egypt